Missong is a Southern Bantoid language of the Lower Fungom region of Cameroon, spoken in the village of the same name. It is closely related to Mungbam. There are around 400 speakers.

References

Beboid languages
Languages of Cameroon